

People
Yoakum (surname)

Places
Yoakum, Texas
Yoakum County, Texas

See also
Yoakam
Yocum